La Porrassa is a small farm town in the municipality of Calvià on the island of Majorca, part of the Spanish autonomous community of the Balearic Islands. It is adjacent to Son Ferrer to the west and Magaluf on the south. The municipality's promenade, the Paseo Calvia, winds through La Porrassa. It has a population of approximately 128 inhabitants.

History
The army of King James I of Aragon camped in the La Porrassa area when he started the conquest of the island.

There are only a few houses besides the large country farmhouse of the landowner. The farmhouse was built between 1595 and 1616 with sandstone and stone masonry. The tower remains in good condition, protected by the law of Spanish heritage.

The town has a nursery, a school and two water parks.

References

Populated places in Calvià